Robert Shaw Cameron (born Robert Shaw; 26 June 1976) is a British actor and director.

Background 
Born Robert Shaw, he was brought up in Leeds, Yorkshire, England. He is the son of a teacher and engineer and has an elder sister.

Shaw attended North Ossett High School and then Rodillian High School in Leeds. He later obtained his degree in drama at the University of Birmingham, before attending the Webber Douglas Academy of Dramatic Art in London, from which he graduated in July 2001. He became Robert Cameron on graduation from drama school before re establishing his birth name in his professional name, becoming Robert Shaw Cameron in 2010.

He lives in London.

Theatre director 
He directed First Person Shooter by Paul Jenkins at Birmingham Repertory Theatre for which he received the following reviews:

"But not only does the production, ably directed by Robert Shaw Cameron, allow us to peer into the gaming world he’s immersed in, thanks to smart video projections, it also uses his situation to explore a profound cultural shift."**** Daily Telegraph

"First Person Shooter is smart and driven."**** The Birmingham Post

"the computer graphics of Robert Shaw Cameron's production are stylishly done."*** The Guardian

Actor 
He is also an actor, his first television role was in the EastEnders spin-off Ricky & Bianca in 2002, before going on to appear in The Bill, The Wild Life, Where The Heart Is, The Basil Brush Show, Shane by Frank Skinner, Holby City, Heartbeat, Keen Eddie and was the voice of the Quizmaster for ITV's 24 Hour Quiz.

He has also appeared in numerous theatre productions and several new plays by Tony award nominated playwright Bryony Lavery.

References

External links 
Official website

Birmingham Repertory Theatre website

1976 births
English male television actors
English male stage actors
English male film actors
English male voice actors
English male radio actors
Alumni of the University of Birmingham
Alumni of the Webber Douglas Academy of Dramatic Art
British male Shakespearean actors
Living people
People from Ossett
Actors from Wakefield